Ouvrage Téting is a lesser work (petit ouvrage) of the Maginot Line.  Located in the Fortified Sector of Faulquemont, the ouvrage consists of one infantry block and two observation blocks, and is located facing Germany between petits ouvrages Laudrefang and the Saar valley, which was to be inundated in times of emergency. With artillery support from its neighbor Laudrefang, Téting held out against German bombardment during the Battle of France in 1940.  It is now abandoned.

Design and construction 
The site was surveyed by the Commission d'Organisation des Régions Fortifiées (CORF), the Maginot Line's design and construction agency, and was approved for construction in January 1931. Téting was completed at a cost of 11 million francs by the contractor Générale des Travaux Publics. The petit ouvrage was to be expanded in a second phase with an 81mm mortar turret and a separate entrance block.

Description 
Téting comprises three infantry blocks. Blocks 1 and 2 are linked by deep underground galleries, which also provide modest space for barracks, utilities and ammunition storage. Block 3 is not connected. A plan to provide gallery access to the block in Phase 2 was not undertaken.
Block 1: Infantry block with one automatic rifle cloche (GFM) and two twin machine gun cloches (JM).
Block 2: Infantry block with one GFM cloche, one grenade launcher cloche (LG) and one retractable twin machine gun turret, one twin machine gun embrasure and one machine gun/anti-tank gun embrasure (JM/AC47).
Block 3: Infantry/entry block with two GFM cloches, one twin machine gun embrasure and one machine gun/anti-tank gun embrasure (JM/AC47). The block was heavily damaged by German bombardment in 1940.

Casemates and shelters 
In addition to the connected combat blocks and Block 3, two small blockhouses mounting light arms are mixed among the combat blocks. A series of detached casemates and infantry shelters surround Téting, including
 Casemate du Bois-de-Laudrefang Nord: SIngle block with one mortar cloche, one GFM-A cloche and one GFM-A/B cloche.
 Casemate du Bois-de-Laudrefang Sud: SIngle block with one mortar cloche, one GFM-A cloche and one GFM-A/B cloche.
 Casemate de Téting: SIngle artillery block with two 75mm gun embrasures and a GFM cloche, located well to the rear.

Manning 
The 1940 manning of the ouvrage under the command of Lieutenant Marchelli comprised 125 men and 2 officers of the 146th Fortress Infantry Regiment. The units were under the umbrella of both the 3rd and 4th Armies, Army Group 2. The Casernement de Téting provided peacetime above-ground barracks and support services to Téting and other positions in the area.

History 
See Fortified Sector of Faulquemont for a broader discussion of the Faulquemont sector of the Maginot Line.
Following the 15 June 1940 breakthrough by German forces through the Saar gap, the Germans advanced along the rear of the Maginot Line.  The German 167th Infantry Division approached Kerfent, Bambesch, Einseling  and Téting on 19 June. On 21 June 1940 Téting came under attack  from 8.8cm guns. Covering fire from the 81mm mortars of Laudrefang prevented the Germans from directly assaulting Téting. The ouvrage survived until the Second Armistice at Compiègne took effect on 25 June, when it surrendered.

After World War II, Téting was in poor condition and was not chosen for renovation.

Current condition 
Téting is abandoned and vandalized, but retains some of its equipment.

See also 
 List of all works on Maginot Line
 Siegfried Line
 Atlantic Wall
 Czechoslovak border fortifications

Notes

References

Bibliography 
Allcorn, William. The Maginot Line 1928-45. Oxford: Osprey Publishing, 2003. 
Kaufmann, J.E. and Kaufmann, H.W. Fortress France: The Maginot Line and French Defenses in World War II, Stackpole Books, 2006. 
Kaufmann, J.E., Kaufmann, H.W., Jancovič-Potočnik, A. and Lang, P. The Maginot Line: History and Guide, Pen and Sword, 2011. 
Mary, Jean-Yves; Hohnadel, Alain; Sicard, Jacques. Hommes et Ouvrages de la Ligne Maginot, Tome 1. Paris, Histoire & Collections, 2001.  
Mary, Jean-Yves; Hohnadel, Alain; Sicard, Jacques. Hommes et Ouvrages de la Ligne Maginot, Tome 2. Paris, Histoire & Collections, 2003.  
Mary, Jean-Yves; Hohnadel, Alain; Sicard, Jacques. Hommes et Ouvrages de la Ligne Maginot, Tome 3. Paris, Histoire & Collections, 2003.  
Mary, Jean-Yves; Hohnadel, Alain; Sicard, Jacques. Hommes et Ouvrages de la Ligne Maginot, Tome 5. Paris, Histoire & Collections, 2009.

External links
 Association de Sauvegarde des Petits Ouvrages de Laudrefang et Téting 
 L'ouvrage de Téting at alsacemaginot.com 
 Teting (petit ouvrage A38 de) at fortiff.be 
 Petit ouvrage de Téting at lignemaginot.com 
 PO de TETING (A.38) at kerfent.com 
 Petit Ouvrage de TETING (A38) at la-ligne-maginot.com 

TETI
Maginot Line